The Massachusetts Area of Critical Environmental Concern (ACEC) Program is a list of state-designated places within the Commonwealth that receive special attention due to their natural and cultural resources. The program was established in 1975 and includes a list of thirty ACECs covering over 268,000 acres in seventy six communities throughout the state. The ACEC Program is administered by the Department of Conservation and Recreation (DCR) on behalf of the Secretary of Energy and Environmental Affairs.

List of ACECs in Massachusetts

References

Government of Massachusetts